In mathematics, a Bratteli diagram is a combinatorial structure: a graph composed of vertices labelled by positive integers ("level") and unoriented edges between vertices having levels differing by one.  The notion was introduced by Ola Bratteli in 1972 in the theory of operator algebras to describe directed sequences of finite-dimensional algebras: it played an important role in Elliott's classification of AF-algebras and the theory of subfactors.  Subsequently Anatoly Vershik associated dynamical systems with infinite paths in such graphs.

Definition
A Bratteli diagram is given by the following objects:
 A sequence of sets Vn ('the vertices at level n ') labeled by positive integer set N.  In some literature each element v of Vn is accompanied by a positive integer bv > 0.
 A sequence of sets En ('the edges from level n to n + 1 ') labeled by N, endowed with maps s: En → Vn and r: En → Vn+1, such that:
 For each v in Vn, the number of elements e in En with s(e) = v is finite.
 So is the number of e ∈ En−1 with r(e) = v.
 When the vertices have markings by positive integers bv, the number av, v ' of the edges with s(e) = v and r(e) = v' for v ∈ Vn and v' ∈ Vn+1 satisfies bv av, v' ≤ bv'.

A customary way to pictorially represent Bratteli diagrams is to align the vertices according to their levels, and put the number bv beside the vertex v, or use that number in place of v, as in

An ordered Bratteli diagram is a Bratteli diagram together with a partial order on En such that for any v ∈ Vn the set { e ∈ En−1 : r(e) = v } is totally ordered. Edges that do not share a common range vertex are incomparable. This partial order allows us to define the set of all maximal edges Emax and the set of all minimal edges Emin. A Bratteli diagram with a unique infinitely long path in Emax and Emin is called essentially simple.

Sequence of finite-dimensional algebras
Any semisimple algebra over the complex numbers C of finite dimension can be expressed as a direct sum ⊕k Mnk(C) of matrix algebras, and the C-algebra homomorphisms between two such algebras up to inner automorphisms on both sides are completely determined by the multiplicity number between 'matrix algebra' components.  Thus, an injective homomorphism of ⊕k=1i Mnk(C) into ⊕l=1j Mml(C) may be represented by a collection of positive numbers ak, l satisfying Σ nk ak, l ≤ ml. (The equality holds if and only if the homomorphism is unital; we can allow non-injective homomorphisms by allowing some ak,l to be zero.)  This can be illustrated as a bipartite graph having the vertices marked by numbers (nk)k on one hand and the ones marked by (ml)l on the other hand, and having ak, l edges between the vertex nk and the vertex ml.

Thus, when we have a sequence of finite-dimensional semisimple algebras An and injective homomorphisms φn : A<sub>n</sub> → An+1: between them, we obtain a Bratteli diagram by putting

 Vn = the set of simple components of An

(each isomorphic to a matrix algebra), marked by the size of matrices.

 (En, r, s): the number of the edges between Mnk(C) ⊂ An and Mml(C) ⊂ An+1 is equal to the multiplicity of Mnk(C) into Mml(C) under φn.

Sequence of split semisimple algebras

Any semisimple algebra (possibly of infinite dimension) is one whose modules are completely reducible, i.e. they decompose into the direct sum of simple modules. Because of the inclusion , any -module  restricts to a -module. Let  denote the decomposition numbers

 

Examples

(1) If , the ith symmetric group, the corresponding Bratteli diagram is the same as Young's lattice.

(2) If  is the Brauer algebra or the Birman–Wenzl algebra on i strands, then the resulting Bratteli diagram has partitions of i–2k (for ) with one edge between partitions on adjacent levels if one can be obtained from the other by adding or subtracting 1 from a single part.

(3) If  is the Temperley–Lieb algebra on i strands, the resulting Bratteli has integers i–2k'' (for ) with one edge between integers on adjacent levels if one can be obtained from the other by adding or subtracting 1.

See also
Bratteli–Vershik diagram

References

 
 
 
 

Application-specific graphs
Operator algebras